Dry Creek is a stream in Boone and Kenton counties, Kentucky, in the United States. It is a tributary of the Ohio River.

Dry Creek was so named from low water levels during dry weather.

A large wastewater treatment plant has operated on Dry Creek since 1979.

See also
List of rivers of Kentucky

References

Rivers of Boone County, Kentucky
Rivers of Kenton County, Kentucky
Rivers of Kentucky
Tributaries of the Ohio River